Vincenzo Ferrara (born 29 June 1993) is an Italian professional footballer who plays as a winger for Desenzano Calvina.

Club career
Born in Caserta, Ferrara started his career in Sassuolo youth system. He made his senior debut on 14 May 2011 as a late substitute against Padova for Serie B.

After his debut, he joined on loan to Reggiana and Aprilia, and in 2014 he left Sassuolo and joined Serie D club Virtus Castelfranco.

In the 2019–20 season, he played for Arzignano.

In 2020, he signed for Alma Juventus Fano.

On 13 July 2021, he joined Serie C club Trento. On 17 December 2021, his contract with Trento was terminated by mutual consent. On 20 December 2021, he signed with Serie D club Desenzano Calvina.

References

External links
 
 

1993 births
Living people
People from Caserta
Footballers from Campania
Italian footballers
Association football wingers
Serie B players
Serie C players
Serie D players
U.S. Sassuolo Calcio players
A.C. Reggiana 1919 players
F.C. Aprilia Racing Club players
A.C. Este players
Virtus Verona players
F.C. Arzignano Valchiampo players
Alma Juventus Fano 1906 players
A.C. Trento 1921 players
Sportspeople from the Province of Caserta